Amandine Hesse (born 16 January 1993) is a French professional tennis player.

Hesse has won six singles and eight doubles titles on the ITF Women's Circuit. On 9 May 2016, she reached her career-high WTA singles ranking of world No. 154. On 2 May 2016, she peaked at No. 108 in the doubles rankings.

Playing for France Fed Cup team, Hesse has accumulated a win–loss record of 3–1.

Personal life
Amandine Hesse was born in Montauban and started playing tennis at the age of five. She is coached by father, Yannick Hesse. Her mother's name is Nicole. She has two half-sisters, Géraldine and Stéphanie.

Grand Slam performance timelines

Singles

Doubles

ITF Circuit finals

Singles: 16 (6 titles, 10 runner–ups)

Doubles: 23 (8 titles, 15 runner–ups)

References

External links

 
 
 
 
 

1993 births
Living people
People from Montauban
French female tennis players
Sportspeople from Tarn-et-Garonne